Angela Williams (born January 30, 1980 in Bellflower, California) is an American athlete. Williams attended the University of Southern California, graduating in 2002. She won the Honda Sports Award as the nation's best female track and field competitor in 2002, which qualified her as a nominee for the Honda-Broderick Cup, awarded to the best overall female collegiate athlete in 12 sports. She was named the winner of that award also in 2002.

Starting for the American national team in 2001, she won a silver medal in the 60 metres competition at the 2001 IAAF World Indoor Championships. She later repeated the event at the 2003 Indoor Championships, but was upgraded to gold winner after Zhanna Block was disqualified for doping. At the 2003 World Championships in Athletics she won silver in the 4 x 100 m relay, along with teammates Chryste Gaines, Inger Miller, and Torri Edwards. Williams also competed in the 4 x 100 metres relay at the 2004 Summer Olympics, with the American team easily winning in the first heat but not being able to finish in the final. In 2002, Angela Williams became the first person to win four consecutive individual NCAA titles in the 100m. In 1999, she won in 11.04 at the age of 19. In 2000, she clocked 11.12, 11.05w in 2001 and 11.29 in 2002.

Williams represented the United States at the 2008 Summer Olympics in Beijing. She competed at the 4x100 metres relay together with Mechelle Lewis, Torri Edwards and Lauryn Williams. In their first round heat they were disqualified and eliminated from the final.

Williams had a stellar career as a youth athlete, setting the still currently ratified American records in the 100 meters, for age 9–10, 11–12, and 15–16, along with the 11–12 record for 200 meters.

Williams attended Chino High School and won the CIF California State Championships in the 100 metres in 1997 and 1998. Her 11.10 1998 winning time was the top mark of the twentieth century, beating Marion Jones. She also won the 200 metres in 1998 In 1997 and 1998 she was named the national Girl's "High School Athlete of the Year" by Track & Field News. She was the fourth female, and the fourth female California sprinter, to receive the honor twice.

References

External links
 California State Records before 2000
 Angela Williams' US Olympic Team bio
 

1980 births
Living people
Track and field athletes from California
American female sprinters
African-American female track and field athletes
Olympic track and field athletes of the United States
Athletes (track and field) at the 2004 Summer Olympics
Athletes (track and field) at the 2008 Summer Olympics
Pan American Games medalists in athletics (track and field)
Pan American Games gold medalists for the United States
Athletes (track and field) at the 1999 Pan American Games
Athletes (track and field) at the 2003 Pan American Games
World Athletics Championships athletes for the United States
World Athletics Championships medalists
World Athletics Indoor Championships winners
World Athletics Indoor Championships medalists
USC Trojans women's track and field athletes
Pan American Games silver medalists for the United States
Universiade medalists in athletics (track and field)
Universiade gold medalists for the United States
USA Indoor Track and Field Championships winners
Medalists at the 1999 Summer Universiade
Medalists at the 1999 Pan American Games
Medalists at the 2003 Pan American Games
Olympic female sprinters
21st-century African-American sportspeople
21st-century African-American women
20th-century African-American people
20th-century African-American women